There have been 153 women in the Australian House of Representatives since the establishment of the Parliament of Australia. Women have had the right to both vote and sit in parliament since 1902. The first woman to run for the House of Representatives was Selina Anderson at the 1903 election for Dalley, but the first woman elected to the House was Dame Enid Lyons at the 1943 election for Darwin. At that election, the first woman member of the Senate was also elected, and there have been women members of the Senate continuously ever since. By contrast, the House of Representatives has had women members continuously only since 1980.

All states and territories have been represented by women in the House of Representatives. In the 45th Australian Parliament there were 44 women.

List
 names in bold indicate women who have been appointed as Ministers and Parliamentary Secretaries
 names in italics indicate entry into Parliament through a by-election
 * symbolises members who have sat as members in both the House of Representatives and the Senate.

Timeline

Proportion of women in the House
Numbers and proportions are as they were directly after the relevant election and do not take into account by-elections, defections or other changes in membership. State-based Coalition parties that caucus with one of the major parties (Liberal National Party, Country Liberal Party) have been included in the Liberals' or Nationals' totals.

See also
Women in the Australian Senate
Women and government in Australia
  2021 Australian Parliament rape allegations
 2021 March 4 Justice

References

Women, House of Representatives
Representatives